Prêmio Jovem Brasileiro (English: Young Award Brazilian)  established in 2002, it honors the young people who are featured in music, television, film, sports, environment and Brazilian internet.

Winners

2015 Winners

Among the winners 2015 stood Thaeme & Thiago, Neymar, Sophia Abrahão, Melody, Rhayner Cadete, Mel Fronckowiack, Lexa, Tulio Borgias , Larissa Manoela, Kéfera Buchmann, Hugo Gloss, Ivete Sangalo, Chris Leão, Arthur Aguiar, Camila Queiroz and Agatha Moreira.

2016 Winners
Among the winners 2016 stood Anajú Dorigon, Anitta, Arthur Nory, Hugo Gloss, Sophia Abrahão, Ludmilla, Nah Cardoso, Neymar, Catraca Livre, Nonô Lellis, Thaynara OG and Whinderson Nunes.

2016

In 2016 came the 15th edition of the Prêmio Jovem Brasileiro,  the award had the presence of several Brazilians famous

2017
In 2017, the awards ceremony took place on September 25 in São Paulo, Brazil. Several celebrities attended the awards, among them Emilly Araújo, Maria Claudia, Sophia Abrahão, Whindersson Nunes, Mayla Araújo, Banda Malta and Maisa.

2020
In 2020, the award ceremony took place on September 22, 2020 in São Paulo, presented by Rodrigo Faro and for the first time it took place in the drive-in format due to the COVID-19 pandemic.

References

Awards established in 2002
Brazilian awards
Magazine awards